Tillandsia brachyphylla is a species of flowering plant in the Bromeliaceae family. This species is endemic to Brazil.

References

brachyphylla
Flora of Brazil
Taxa named by John Gilbert Baker